The Curtiss C-6 is a six-cylinder, water-cooled, inline aircraft engine.

Design and development
The C-6 features an overhead cam and aluminum cylinder jackets. Further development as a V-12 engine was carried out resulting in the C-12 and CD-12 engines.

Variants
6-cylinder water-cooled in-line engine

Applications
Curtiss Lark
Curtiss Oriole
Curtiss MF Seagull
Laird C-6 Special
Pitcairn PA-1 Fleetwing
Pitcairn PA-2 Sesquiwing
Travel Air 2000
Waco 9
Marinens Flyvebaatfabrikk M.F.3

Engines on display
The Museum of Flight in Seattle, Washington has a Curtiss C-6A on display.
The Canada Aviation and Space Museum has a Curtiss C-6A mounted on its Curtiss MF Seagull.

Specifications (C-6)

See also

References

1920s aircraft piston engines
Curtiss aircraft engines